The  is a dam on the Tenryū River, located in Tenryū-ku, Hamamatsu, Shizuoka Prefecture on the island of Honshū, Japan.

History
The potential of the Tenryū River valley for hydroelectric power development was realized by the Meiji government at the start of the 20th century. The Tenryū River was characterized by a high volume of flow and a fast current. Its mountainous upper reaches and tributaries were areas of steep valleys and abundant rainfall, and were sparsely populated. However, the bulk of investment in hydroelectric power generation in the region was centered on the Ōi River, and it was not until the Taishō period that development began on the Tenryū River. The first dams on the main stream of the Tenryū River were built in Nagano Prefecture. To develop of the hydroelectric potential of the river in Shizuoka Prefecture, the post-war Japanese government turned to the Electric Power Development Company. The new company, in part through foreign aid loans from the United Nations, and with the use of new dam technologies completed the huge Sakuma Dam in the 1956, at the time the 10th largest in the world.
The Akiba Dam was designed as a pumped-storage hydroelectricity facility, with the discharge from Sakuma Dam discharging through a penstock into a lake created by the smaller Akiba Dam downstream. The reversible turbine generators at the Sakuma power plant were designed to function as either electrical power generators, or as pumps, to reverse the flow of water back into the reservoir in times of low demand.
Construction began in 1954 and was completed in 1958 by the Kumagai Gumi.

Design
The Akiba Dam is a hollow-core concrete gravity dam with several central spillways. It supplies water to the nearby Akiba No. 1 Hydroelectric Power Station, with a rated capacity of 45,300 kW, and to the Akiba No. 2 Hydroelectric Power Station, with a rated capacity of 34,900 kW. A third station, the Akiba No. 3 Hydroelectric Power Station was added in 1989 with a rated capacity of 46,900 kW. The Akiba Dam was designed as a multipurpose dam. In addition to hydroelectric power generation, the dam provides industrial water to the city of Hamamatsu, and water for irrigation to a large area of eastern Shizuoka Prefecture.

However, as with other dams on the Tenryū and Ōi rivers, the dam has been rapidly filling with sand and silt from the mountains upstream, and the reduction of the amount of sand and silt reaching the river mouth has caused problems with coastal erosion.

Surroundings
The Akiba Dam Reservoir is a popular attraction for canoeing and camping, due to its proximity to downtown Hamamatsu as well as the Akihasan Hongū Akiha Jinja, and it is located within the boundaries of the Tenryū-Okumikawa Quasi-National Park.

References
Japan Commission on Large Dams. Dams in Japan:Past, Present and Future. CRC Press (2009). 
photo page with data

Gravity dams
Dams in Shizuoka Prefecture
Hydroelectric power stations in Japan
Dams completed in 1958